Bolckow may refer to:
 Henry William Ferdinand Bolckow
 Bolckow, Missouri